The 2016 Pittsburgh Riverhounds season is the club's seventeenth season of existence. It is the Riverhounds' six season playing in the United Soccer League, and the club's fourth season hosting matches at soccer-specific Highmark Stadium.

Preseason
On November 2, 2015 it was announced that Richard Nightingale was no longer with the team and that Shallenberger had taken over as acting president. After one season without an MLS affiliate, it was announced that the club had formed an affiliate partnership with the reigning Eastern Conference playoff champion and MLS Cup runner-up Columbus Crew SC for the 2016 season.

Competitions

Preseason

U.S. Open Cup

United Soccer League 

All times in regular season on Eastern Daylight Time (UTC-04:00)

Standings

Results 
All times in Eastern Time.

Schedule source

2016 roster

Transfers

In

Out

References

Pittsburgh Riverhounds SC seasons
Pittsburgh Riverhounds
Pittsburgh Riverhounds